Clive Hogger (born 1970) is one of several Associate Archdeacons in the Diocese of Sheffield. He was also the first person to undertake a new role as Assistant Archdeacon in the Diocese of Coventry. Prior to that he was the Acting Archdeacon Pastor of the Diocese of Coventry (2017March 2018) between the retirement of John Green and the collation of Sue Field.

Hogger was educated at Watford Grammar School for Boys and Sheffield University and trained for ministry at Ridley Hall, Cambridge. He was ordained in the Church of England: made deacon at Petertide (29 June) 2008 and ordained priest the Petertide following (4 July 2009) — both times by John Stroyan, Bishop of Warwick, in Coventry Cathedral. After a curacy in Fletchamstead he became Team Vicar in the "Coventry East" team (2011–2016) and Area Dean for Coventry East Deanery (2014–2018). In 2016, he became Rector of the new parish of Coventry All Saints which comprises St Anne and All Saints & St Margaret, Coventry (two of the four churches of the old "Coventry East" team), a post he held concurrent with his appointments as Acting Archdeacon Pastor in 2017 and as Assistant Archdeacon. He was made Associate Archdeacon in the Archdeaconry of Doncaster and licensed by the Right Reverend Sophie Jelley, Bishop of Doncaster, in September 2021.

References

1970 births
Living people
Alumni of the University of Sheffield
Alumni of Ridley Hall, Cambridge
20th-century English Anglican priests
21st-century English Anglican priests